Henry Starr (1873–1921) was an American criminal of the wild west and an American actor of the silent film era.

Biography
Starr’s parents were Mary Scott Starr and George Starr. Distantly related to Sam Starr, husband of Belle Starr, he was the last in a long line of Starr family criminals.

During Starr’s childhood in Indian Territory, he spent his time around gangs in their hideouts. In 1886, Starr's father passed away. Starr’s widowed mother had to watch three children after that. Later on in life, she married a man named C.N. Walker. Starr disliked him, so he left to become a cowboy at a ranch.

Starr was first arrested and fined for “Introducing spirits into the territory”. Starr was repeatedly arrested for crimes he did not commit. After a while, Starr thought that if he was going to be fined for those crimes, he should just commit a real crime while making a lot of money. That’s when he started to rob banks.

Starr was tried for the murder of Deputy U.S. Marshal Floyd Wilson in 1893. Twice sentenced by Judge Isaac Parker to hang for murder, following a series of appeals and Starr's confrontation with Cherokee Bill, who was attempting a prison break, his sentence was reduced to a sentence of imprisonment for manslaughter. Starr was eventually granted a Presidential pardon and released.

Starr went on to form a notorious gang that terrorized and robbed throughout northwest Arkansas around the start of the 20th century. They were on a crime spree, and the reward if Starr was caught would be $5,000.

He was imprisoned again in 1915 in Arizona, wrote his autobiography, Thrilling Events, Life of Henry Starr and, released on parole, even portrayed himself in the silent film, A Debtor to the Law (1919). While attempting to rob a bank in Harrison, Arkansas, on February 18, 1921, he was shot by the bank president W. J. Myers with a .38 caliber rifle, and later died of his wounds.

References 

Outlaws of the American Old West
Cowboys
1873 births
1921 deaths
American people convicted of murdering police officers
Train robbers
American prisoners sentenced to death
Gunslingers of the American Old West
Prisoners sentenced to death by the United States federal government
People convicted of murder by the United States federal government
American male silent film actors
20th-century American male actors